The Mille Miglia (Thousand Miles) was an open-road, motorsport endurance race established in 1927 by the young Counts Francesco Mazzotti and Aymo Maggi, which took place in Italy twenty-four times from 1927 to 1957 (thirteen before World War II, eleven from 1947).

Like the older Targa Florio and later the Carrera Panamericana in Mexico, the MM made grand tourers like Alfa Romeo, BMW, Ferrari, Maserati, Mercedes-Benz, and Porsche famous. The race brought out an estimated five million spectators.

From 1953 until 1957, the Mille Miglia was also a round of the World Sports Car Championship.

Since 1977, the "Mille Miglia" has been reborn as a regularity race for classic and vintage cars. Participation is limited to cars, produced no later than 1957, which had attended (or were registered to) the original race. The route (Brescia–Rome round trip) is similar to that of the original race, maintaining the point of departure/arrival in Viale Venezia in Brescia.

Car numbering 
Unlike modern day rallying, where cars are released with larger professional-class cars going before slower cars, in the Mille Miglia the smaller, slower, lower displacement cars started first. This made organisation simpler as marshals did not have to be on duty for as long a period and it minimised the period that roads had to be closed. From 1949, cars were assigned numbers according to their start time. For example, the 1955 Moss/Jenkinson car, #722, left Brescia at 07:22 (see below), while the first cars had started at 21:00 the previous day. In the early days of the race, even winners needed 16 hours or more, so most competitors had to start before midnight and arrived after dusk - if at all.

History

Before World War II 
 

The race was established by the young Counts Aymo Maggi and Franco Mazzotti, sports manager Renzo Castagneto and motoring journalist Giovanni Canestrini, apparently in response to the Italian Grand Prix being moved from their home town of Brescia to Monza. Together with a group of wealthy associates, they chose a race from Brescia to Rome and back, a figure-eight shaped course of roughly 1500 km — or a thousand Roman miles. Later races followed twelve other routes of varying total lengths.

The first race started on 26 March 1927 with seventy-seven starters — all Italian — of which fifty-one had reached the finishing post at Brescia by the end of the race. The first Mille Miglia covered 1,618 km, corresponding to just over 1,005 modern miles. Entry was strictly restricted to unmodified production cars, and the entrance fee was set at a nominal 1 lira. The winner, Giuseppe Morandi, completed the course in just under 21 hours 5 minutes, averaging nearly 78 km/h (48 mph) in his 2-litre OM; Brescia based OM swept the top three places.

Tazio Nuvolari won the 1930 Mille Miglia in an Alfa Romeo 6C. Having started after his teammate and rival Achille Varzi, Nuvolari was leading the race but was still behind Varzi (holder of provisional second position) on the road. In the dim half-light of early dawn, Nuvolari tailed Varzi with his headlights off, thereby not being visible in the latter's rear-view mirrors. He then overtook Varzi on the straight roads approaching the finish at Brescia, by pulling alongside and flicking his headlights on.

The event was usually dominated by local Italian drivers and marques, but three races were won by foreign cars. The first one was in 1931, when German driver Rudolf Caracciola (famous in Grand Prix racing) and riding mechanic Wilhelm Sebastian won with their big supercharged Mercedes-Benz SSKL, averaging for the first time more than 100 km/h (63 mph) in a Mille Miglia. Caracciola had received very little support from the factory due to the economic crisis at that time. He did not have enough mechanics to man all necessary service points. After performing a pit stop, they had to hurry across Italy, cutting the triangle-shaped course short in order to arrive in time before the race car.

The race was briefly stopped by Italian leader Benito Mussolini after an accident in 1938 killed a number of spectators. This race saw 11 spectator fatalities; a Lancia Aprilla being driven by Angelo Mignanego and Dr. Luigi Bruzzo just before they entered Bologna went off the road and crashed into a whole group of spectators lining the road to watch the race. 10 people were killed- 5 of whom were children and 26 were injured; both competitors survived. Earlier in the race, another accident took the life of a 12 year old girl in Padova. The race was not run in 1939, and when it resumed in April 1940 shortly before Italy entered World War II, it was dubbed the Grand Prix of Brescia, and held on a  short course in the plains of northern Italy that was lapped nine times.

This event saw the debut of the first Enzo Ferrari-owned marque AAC (Auto Avio Costruzioni) (with the Tipo 815).

After World War II 

The Italians continued to dominate their race after the war, now again on a single big lap through Italy. Mercedes made another good effort in 1952 with the underpowered Mercedes-Benz 300 SL Gullwing, scoring second with the German crew Karl Kling/Hans Klenk that later in the year would win the Carrera Panamericana. Caracciola, in a comeback attempt, was fourth.

Few other non-Italians managed podium finishes in the 1950s, among them Juan Manuel Fangio, Peter Collins and Wolfgang von Trips.

Stirling Moss at the Mille Miglia 

In 1955, Mercedes made another attempt at winning the MM, this time with careful preparation and a more powerful car, the Mercedes-Benz 300 SLR which was based on the Formula One car (Mercedes-Benz W196), entirely different from their sports cars carrying the 300 SL name.

Both young German Hans Herrmann (who had had remarkable previous efforts with Porsche) and Briton Stirling Moss relied on the support of navigators while Juan Manuel Fangio (car #658) preferred to drive alone as usual, as he considered open road races dangerous after his co-pilot and friend was killed during a race across South America. Karl Kling also drove alone, in the fourth Mercedes, #701.

Similar to his teammates, Moss and his navigator, motor race journalist Denis Jenkinson, ran a total of six reconnaissance laps beforehand, enabling "Jenks" to make course notes (pace notes) on a scroll of paper 18 ft (540 cm) long that he read from and gave directions to Moss during the race by a coded system of 15 hand signals. Although this undoubtedly helped them, Moss's innate ability and the 300 SLR’s exceptional build quality were clearly the predominant factors. Moss was competing against drivers with a large amount of local knowledge of the route, so the reconnaissance laps were considered an equaliser, rather than an advantage.

Car #704 with Hans Herrmann and Hermann Eger was said to be fastest in the early stages, though. Herrmann had already had a remarkable race in 1954, when the gate on a railroad crossing was lowered in the last moment before the fast train to Rome passed. Driving a very low Porsche 550 Spyder, Herrmann decided it was too late for a brake attempt anyway, knocked on the back of the helmet of his navigator Herbert Linge to make him duck, and they barely passed below the gates and before the train, to the surprise of the spectators. Herrmann was less lucky in 1955, having to abandon the race after a brake failure on the Futa Pass between Florence and Bologna, while Kling crashed just outside Rome.

Fangio arrived a few minutes later in the #658 car, but having started 24 min earlier, it actually took him about 30 minutes longer, having engine problems at Pescara, through Rome and by the time Fangio reached Florence, a fuel injection pipe had broken and he was running on 7 cylinders.

The end 
The race was known for its incredible danger to not only drivers but also spectators; this race, over its 30 year history took the lives of a total of 56 people- an average of 7 people every 3 events. Most of these fatal accidents were caused on the fastest parts of the route and almost always involved spectator fatalities; one particular part that was notorious was the very fast first 200 miles of the route that ran between Brescia and Ravenna. 

The original race was ended after two fatal crashes in the 1957 race. The first was the crash of a factory-entered 4.0-litre Ferrari 335 S that took the lives of 11 people- that of the Spanish driver Alfonso de Portago, his American co-driver/navigator Edmund Nelson and nine spectators, at the village of Guidizzolo less than 50 miles from the finish. Five of the spectators killed were children, all of whom were standing along the race course. Portago, who was called in as a last-minute replacement and was already unsettled by doing a race he felt was too dangerous, waited too long to make a tyre change. The crash was caused by a worn tyre. The manufacturer was sued for this, as was the Ferrari team. Another crash, in Brescia, took the life of Joseph Göttgens. He was driving a Triumph TR3.

From 1958 to 1961, the event resumed as a rallying-like round trip at legal speeds with a few special stages driven at full speed, but this was discontinued also.

Circuit variants
The original route from 1927-1930 was run anti-clockwise and headed down to Rome via Piadena, Parma, Modena, Bologna, Florence, Siena and Viterbo, then it headed north up a mountainous route through Perugia and Gubbio, then would join the Adriatic sea route at Porto Recanti, then through Pesaro, Rimini, Forli, Bologna, Ferrara, Padova and Treviso. This variant used to use a route that went into the Dolomite town of Feltre then headed south towards Vincenza, Verona and then finally towards Brescia.  The first part of the circuit was changed in 1931 where it bypassed the Piadena route and went directly south towards Cremona, and then went east and rejoined the existing route at Parma; this was used until 1933. The next route, used from 1934 to 1936 saw Feltre and the Dolomites section bypassed and a route that ran near Venice was added, but the rest of the route was the same. From 1937 to 1938, the route was substantially modified. Although the top half remained more or less the same the bottom half was rerouted at Florence to run west towards Lucca and Pisa, and then ran along the Tyrrehennian West Coast down through Livorno, Grosseto and Vetralla before reaching Rome. The circuit then went up and cut through the mountainous range, bypassing Perugia right up to Pesaro, and joining the existing route. This was the last of the pre-WWII Mille Miglia circuits that ran through Bologna twice. The 1940 event was called the "Grand Prix of Brescia" and was run on a very fast  course in northern Italy, that went from Brescia, went west at the village of Le Grazie and then went north from Cremona back to Brescia.

In 1947, the race was run clockwise for the first time, and the circuit route was modified. Treviso and Venice were bypassed, and the route from the 1937 variant remained the same but from Piacenza the route went further west towards Alessandra and then went north and east from Turin to Novara, Milan, Bergamo and finally ending at Brescia. In 1949 the race was reverted back to being run anti-clockwise, and was also rerouted. This was perhaps the fastest variant of the Mille Miglia circuit route- Bologna, Modena, Florence, and the Futa and Raticosa Passes were all bypassed as this variant ran largely along the Italian coasts. At Parma, the circuit ran south through another route through the Appenine mountains towards La Spezia and Massa, before rejoining the 1947 variant at Pisa. The circuit was then rerouted to go through the mountain towns of Rieti and L'Aquila, and then went further east towards Pescara, where it went along the Adriatic coast before rejoining the 1947 circuit at Pesaro. The circuit then cut past Forli and went through Ravenna before rejoining the previous route at Ferrara.

The 1950 variant saw the race being switched back to being run clockwise permanently. The circuit remained largely the same up until Pisa, as the route that went east to Florence that was first introduced in 1937 was re-introduced, and then part of the original route up through the Futa and Raticosa Passes to Bologna, then going west towards Modena and Piacenza was also re-introduced. For the 1951 event the direct route between Ravenna and Rimini was bypassed, and the circuit was diverted from Ravenna to Forli and back to Rimini again. But more significantly the Tyhrennian coast section first introduced in 1937 was eliminated and part of the original route that ran from Rome to Florence via Viterbo and Siena was re-introduced. The route was not changed until 1954, when a new section was introduced to pay tribute to Tazio Nuvolari that diverted from Cremona and ran through his home province of Mantua, which was the final iteration of the circuit used for the original race.

Mille Miglia winners

Mille Miglia Storica

Since 1977, the race was revived as the Mille Miglia Storica, a parade for pre-1957 cars that takes several days, which also spawned the 2007 documentary film Mille Miglia – The Spirit of a Legend.

Mille Miglia Storica winners
 1977:  Hepp / Bauer – Alfa Romeo RL Super Sport – 1927 
 1982:  Bacchi / Montanari – O.S.C.A MT 4 – 1956
 1984:  Palazzani / Campana – Stanguellini 1100 S – 1947
 1986:  Schildbach / Netzer – Mercedes-Benz SSK – 1929
 1987:  Nannini / Marin – Maserati 200 SI – 1957
 1988:  Rollino / Gaslini – Fiat 1100 S MM – 1948
 1989:  Valseriati / Favero – Mercedes-Benz 300 SL – 1955
 1990:  Agnelli / Cavallari – Cisitalia 202 SC – 1950
 1991:  Panizza / Pisanelli – Renault 750 Sport – 1954
 1992:  Giuliano Canè / Lucia Galliani – BMW 507 – 1957
 1993:  Vesco / Bocelli – Cisitalia 202 SC – 1948
 1994:  Giuliano Canè / Lucia Galliani – Lancia Aurelia B 20 – 1957
 1995:  Ferrari / Salza – Abarth 750 Zagato – 1957
 1996:  Giuliano Canè / Lucia Galliani – BMW 328 MM – 1937
 1997:  Valseriati / Sabbadini – Mercedes-Benz 300 SL – 1952
 1998:  Giuliano Canè / Lucia Galliani – BMW 328 MM – 1937
 1999:  Giuliano Canè / Auteri – Ferrari 340 MM – 1953
 2000:  Giuliano Canè / Lucia Galliani – BMW 328 MM – 1937
 2001:  Sisti / Bernini – Healey Silverstone – 1950
 2002:  Giuliano Canè / Lucia Galliani – BMW 328 Touring – 1940
 2003:  Sielecki / Hervas – Bugatti T 23 Brescia – 1923
 2004:  Giuliano Canè / Lucia Galliani – BMW 328 MM Coupé – 1939
 2005:  Viaro / De Marco – Alfa Romeo 6C 1500 S – 1928 
 2006:  Giuliano Canè / Lucia Galliani – BMW 328 MM Coupé – 1939
 2007:  Viaro / Bergamaschi – Alfa Romeo 6C 1500 Super Sport – 1928 
 2008:  Luciano and Antonio Viaro – Alfa Romeo 6C 1500 Super Sport – 1928 
 2009:  Ferrari / Ferrari – Bugatti Type 37 – 1927
 2010:  Giuliano Canè / Lucia Galliani – BMW 328 MM Coupé – 1939
 2011:  Giordano Mozzi / Stefania Biacca – Aston Martin Le Mans -1933
 2012:  Scalise Claudio / Claramunt Daniel – Alfa Romeo 6C 1500 Gran Sport "Testa Fissa" – 1933 
 2013:  Juan Tonconogy / Guillermo Berisso – Bugatti T40 – 1927
 2014:  Giordano Mozzi / Stefania Biacca – Lancia Lambda tipo 221 spider Ca.Sa.Ro – 1928
 2015:  Juan Tonconogy / Guillermo Berisso – Bugatti T40 – 1927
 2016:  Andrea Vesco / Andrea Guerini – Alfa Romeo 6C 1750 Gran Sport Spider Zagato – 1931 
 2017:  Andrea Vesco / Andrea Guerini – Alfa Romeo 6C 1750 Gran Sport Spider Zagato – 1931 
 2018:  Juan Tonconogy / Barbara Ruffini – Alfa Romeo 6C 1500 Gran Sport "Testa Fissa" Spider Zagato  – 1933 
 2019:  Giovanni Moceri / Daniele Bonetti – Alfa Romeo 6C 1500 Super Sport Spider Stabilimenti Farina – 1928 
 2020:  Andrea Vesco / Roberto Vesco - Alfa Romeo 6C 1750 Gran Sport Spider Zagato  – 1929 
 2021:  Andrea Vesco / Fabio Salvinelli - Alfa Romeo 6C 1750 Gran Sport Spider Zagato – 1929
 2022:  Andrea Vesco / Fabio Salvinelli - Alfa Romeo 6C 1750 Gran Sport Spider Zagato – 1929

Gallery

Mille Miglia Museum 

Since November 2004, the former Monastery of Sant'Eufemia in Brescia houses the Mille Miglia Museum, which illustrates the history of this car race with films, memorabilia, dresses, posters, and a number of classic cars that are periodically replaced by other in case of participation in events.

Name usage 
Owner of the trademark logo of Mille Miglia is the Automobile Club Brescia.

Mille Miglia is also the name of Alitalia's frequent flyer program.

Mille Miglia is also the name of a jacket, named after the race, inspired by the 1920s racewear and designed by Massimo Osti for his CP Company clothing label. The garment features goggles built into the hood and originally had a small circular window in the sleeve enabling the wearer to see their watch. The jackets have been produced for a long period and are still popular with British football casuals.

As a sponsor and timekeeper of the Storica event, the event has lent its name and its trademark logo to Chopard for a series of sports watches. For promotions, Chopard uses photographs from the event by photographer Giacomo Bretzel.

Mille Miglia Red is the name for a colour used by Chevrolet on its Corvette models. The colour was offered between 1972 and 1975.

In 1982 the Mille Miglia endurance race was revived as a road rally event.

"Mille Miglia" is also the title of a song from Lucio Dalla's album Automobili (1976). The song describes anecdotes about the 1947 edition of the race.

Kaneko released two arcade games based on the race in 1994 (1000 Miglia: Great 1000 Miles Rally) and 1995 (Mille Miglia 2: Great 1000 Miles Rally). SCi Games released a PlayStation game simply named Mille Miglia and endorsed by Stirling Moss in 2000 in PAL regions.

In 2008, Alfa Romeo created a limited edition version of its Tipo 939 Spider called the "Mille Miglia". Only 11 cars were built - 8 left-hand drive and 3 right-hand driver - with each numbered car corresponding to one of the marque's Mille Miglia victories. Each car carried a small metal plate with details of the race.

See also 
 List of major automobile races in Italy
 California Mille, an annual historic and classic car tour run on public roads in California

References

External links 

 http://www.1000miglia.eu/
 Mille Miglia Museum, Brescia
 History of the Mille Miglia
 Mille Miglia Today

 
Recurring sporting events established in 1927
Recurring events disestablished in 1957
Historic motorsport events
1927 establishments in Italy
1957 disestablishments in Italy